Youcef Belmehdi (born 29 September 1963) is the Algerian Minister of Religious Affairs and Endowments. He was appointed as minister on 30 June 2021.

Education 
Belmehdi holds a Diploma in Islamic Sciences (1988), a Magister in Islamic Jurisprudence (1997) from the Emir Abdelkader University and a Doctorate in Islamic Jurisprudence (2007) from the Algiers 1 University.

References 

1963 births
Living people
21st-century Algerian politicians
Algerian politicians
Government ministers of Algeria

University of Algiers alumni